Steinar Imsen (born 3 April 1944) is a Norwegian historian, and a professor at the Norwegian University of Science and Technology. His field of concentration is the Late Middle Ages and the Early Modern Period (c. 1300–1700). Imsen has also worked as editor of Norsk historisk leksikon - the Norwegian Historical Encyclopedia.

Bibliography
 Noregs nedgang – short historiography of the Late Middle Ages in Norway (2002) 
 Europa 1300–1550 – textbook on the Late Middle Ages in Europe (2000) 
Har utgitt bl.a. Norsk historisk leksikon (red., 1974/1999) 
Våre dronninger: fra Ragnhild Eriksdatter til Sonja (1991)
Senmiddelalderen: emner fra Europas historie 1300–1550 (1984)
The Norwegian Domination and the Norse World, C.1100-c.1400 (2010)

References

1944 births
Living people
20th-century Norwegian historians
Academic staff of the Norwegian University of Science and Technology
Royal Norwegian Society of Sciences and Letters
21st-century Norwegian historians